One M&T Plaza is an office tower located in Buffalo, New York and home to M&T Bank in Erie County. The 21-story International style or New Formalist office tower was designed by Minoru Yamasaki with Duane Lyman Associates and completed in 1967. The structural steel for the building was produced locally by Bethlehem Steel, and was a product of their V50 grade. The base of the building is composed of white and green marble with an interior of travertine. The building also features a 75-by-225 foot exterior plaza.

History
Three notable buildings existed on the current site prior to One M&T Plaza. These included:

The Richmond Hotel (1887–1888)
Iroquois Hotel, also known as the Gerrans building (1889–1940)
Bond Clothing Company Building (1940–1964)

See also
 List of tallest buildings in Buffalo
 Buffalo Savings Bank building

Gallery

References

External links
 
 

Skyscraper office buildings in Buffalo, New York
Minoru Yamasaki buildings
Office buildings completed in 1967